Koyomi Matsushima (born October 08, 1992) is a Japanese mixed martial artist who competes in the Featherweight division and has previously fought in ONE Championship and Pancrase. Matsushima has faced  strong opposition with the likes of Marat Gafurov, and Garry Tonon.

Background 

Koyomi Matsushima is currently training under Japanese MMA Legend Satoru Kitaoka and has been a combat sports fan all his life, growing up watching karate, judo, wrestling, and mixed martial arts bouts in his native Japan. His own training began first with Kyokushin karate, which he started in order to find his center and build the foundations of his own competitive career.

Mixed martial arts career 
Early in his mixed martial arts career, Koyomi Matsushima faced future Lethwei world champion Dave Leduc on May 2, 2015, whom he defeated by technical knockout in 19 seconds.

ONE Championship
After a successful career in the Japanese MMA circuit, including runs with both Shooto and Pancrase, Matsushima signed with ONE Championship in 2018.

He was scheduled to make his promotional debut against former ONE Featherweight Champion Marat Gafurov at ONE Championship: Conquest of Heroes on September 22, 2018. Matsushima won by first-round technical knockout.  

Matsushima was scheduled to face Kwon Won Il at ONE Championship: Legendary Quest on June 15, 2019. He won by unanimous decision.

After two straight wins, Matsushima challenged Martin Nguyen for the ONE Featherweight World Championship at ONE Championship: Dawn of Heroes on August 2, 2019. Matsushima lost by second-round technical knockout. 

He was scheduled to face Kim Jae Woong at ONE Championship: Warrior's Code on February 7, 2020. Matsushima won by third-round technical knockout.

Matsushima was scheduled to face former ADCC and IBJJF champion Garry Tonon in a featherweight title eliminator at ONE Championship: Big Bang on December 4, 2020. Matsushima was unable to stick to his winning ways, getting dominated on the ground en route to a unanimous decision loss.

Road to UFC 
Matsushima faced Jun Young Hong in the Quarter-Finals of the Featherweight tournament on June 9, 2022 in Road to UFC: Episode 2. He won the bout via split decision.

Matsushima faced Yi Zha in the Semi-Finals of the Featherweight tournament on October 23, 2022 at Road to UFC: Episode 5. He lost the close bout via split decision.

Titles 
Shooto
2015 Shooto Rookie Tournament Champion

Mixed martial arts record

|-
|Loss
|align=center|13–6
|Yi Zha
|Decision (split)
|Road to UFC: Episode 5
|
|align=center|3
|align=center|5:00
|Abu Dhabi, United Arab Emirates
|
|-
|Win
|align=center|13–5
|Jun Young Hong
|Decision (split)
|Road to UFC: Episode 2
|
|align=center|3
|align=center|5:00
|Kallang, Singapore
|
|-
|Loss
|align=center|12–5
|Garry Tonon 
|Decision (unanimous)
|ONE Championship: Big Bang
|
|align=center|3
|align=center|5:00
|Kallang, Singapore 
|
|-
|Win
|align=center|12–4
|Jae Woong Kim
|TKO (punches)
|ONE Championship: Warrior's Code
|
|align=center|3
|align=center|0:24
|Jakarta, Indonesia
|
|-
|Loss
|align=center|11–4
|Martin Nguyen 
|TKO (punches)
|ONE Championship: Dawn of Heroes
|
|align=center|2
|align=center|4:40
|Manila, Philippines 
|
|-
|Win
|align=center|11–3
|Kwon Won Il
|Decision (unanimous)
|ONE Championship: Legendary Quest
|
|align=center|3
|align=center|5:00
|Shanghai, China
|
|-
|Win
|align=center|10–3
|Marat Gafurov
|TKO (punches)
|ONE Championship: Conquest of Heroes
|
|align=center|1
|align=center|1:41
|Jakarta, Indonesia 
|
|-
|Loss
|align=center|9–3
|Isao Kobayashi
|DQ (illegal knee) 
|Pancrase: 295
|
|align=center|1
|align=center|4:34
|Tokyo, Japan
|
|-
|Win
|align=center|9–2
|Kyle Aguon
|Decision (unanimous)
|Pancrase: 292
|
|align=center|3
|align=center|5:00
|Tokyo, Japan
|
|-
|Win
|align=center|8–2
|Yusuke Kasuya
|Decision (unanimous)
|Pancrase: 289
|
|align=center|3
|align=center|5:00
|Tokyo, Japan
|
|- 
|Win
|align=center|7–2
|Yojiro Uchimura
|Decision (unanimous)
|Pancrase: 286 
|
|align=center|3
|align=center|5:00
|Tokyo, Japan
|
|- 
|Loss
|align=center|6–2
|Marlon Sandro 
|TKO (elbows and punches)
|Pancrase: 283 
|
|align=center|1
|align=center|2:51
|Tokyo, Japan
|
|- 
|Win
|align=center|6–1
|Juntaro Ushiku
|Submission (kimura)
|Pancrase: 280 
|
|align=center|3
|align=center|3:11
|Tokyo, Japan 
|
|- 
|Loss
|align=center|5–1
|Rolando Dy 
|KO (punch)
|PXC 53 
|
|align=center|1
|align=center|0:23
|Parañaque, Philippines
|
|- 
|Win
|align=center|5–0
|Daisuke Arakawa
|KO (punch)
|Shooto: Infinity League 2015 Finals 
|
|align=center|1
|align=center|0:16
|Tokyo, Japan
|
|- 
|Win
|align=center|4–0
|Yushikazu Fujishi
|KO (head kick)
|Shooto: Grapplingman 16 
|
|align=center|2
|align=center|0:43
|Tokyo, Japan
|
|- 
|Win
|align=center|3–0
|Eric Gatmen
|KO (slam)
|PXC 49 
|
|align=center|1
|align=center|3:06
|Mangilao, Guam
|
|- 
|Win
|align=center|2–0
|Dave Leduc 
|TKO (punches)
|Hybrid Combat: 3
|
|align=center|1
|align=center|0:19
|Quebec, Canada
|
|- 
|Win
|align=center|1–0
|Yoshinori Takahashi
|KO (punches)
|Shooto: Gig Tokyo 18
|
|align=center|1
|align=center|0:10
|Tokyo, Japan
|
|-

References

External links 
 Koyomi Matsushima at ONE

1992 births
Living people
Japanese male mixed martial artists
Featherweight mixed martial artists
Mixed martial artists utilizing Kyokushin kaikan
Mixed martial artists utilizing judo
Mixed martial artists utilizing wrestling
Japanese male karateka
Japanese male judoka